Febby Valencia Dwijayanti Gani (born 11 February 2000) is an Indonesian badminton player from Semarang, who affiliate with Djarum club. She won the girls' doubles title at the 2017 Indonesian National Junior Championships.

Career 
Gani is a member of Djarum badminton club, and has joined the club since 2016. She won the National circuit tournaments at the 2017 North Sulawesi, Central Java, and East Java Opens in the girls' doubles cadets events partnered with Lisa Ayu Kusumawati. She and Kusumawati then closed the 2017 circuits by winning the Indonesian National Junior Championships. For her achievements in 2017, Gani was selected to join the National training camp in 2018.

In 2018, Gani won the Junior Grand Prix event in India. Partnered with Metya Inayah Cindiani, the duo defeated the 2018 Asian Junior Champion, Febriana Dwipuji Kusuma and Ribka Sugiarto in straight games.

In 2021, Gani won her first World Tour title at the 2021 Spain Masters together with Yulfira Barkah, beating the top seeds from Denmark, Amalie Magelund and Freja Ravn.

Achievements

BWF World Tour (1 title) 
The BWF World Tour, which was announced on 19 March 2017 and implemented in 2018, is a series of elite badminton tournaments sanctioned by the Badminton World Federation (BWF). The BWF World Tour is divided into levels of World Tour Finals, Super 1000, Super 750, Super 500, Super 300 (part of the HSBC World Tour), and the BWF Tour Super 100.

Women's doubles

BWF International Challenge/Series (1 runner-up) 
Women's doubles

  BWF International Challenge tournament
  BWF International Series tournament
  BWF Future Series tournament

BWF Junior International (1 title) 
Girls' doubles

  BWF Junior International Grand Prix tournament
  BWF Junior International Challenge tournament
  BWF Junior International Series tournament
  BWF Junior Future Series tournament

Performance timeline

National team 
 Senior level

Individual competitions 
 Junior level

 Senior level

References

External links 
 

2000 births
Living people
People from Semarang
Sportspeople from Central Java
Indonesian female badminton players
Competitors at the 2021 Southeast Asian Games
Southeast Asian Games silver medalists for Indonesia
Southeast Asian Games medalists in badminton
21st-century Indonesian women